Marian Bîcu (born 21 April 1960) is a Romanian former footballer. In the 1985–86 season he scored 25 goals, making him the top goalscorer of Universitatea Craiova and the third goalscorer in Liga I, after Gheorghe Hagi and Victor Piţurcă. In the 1990–91 season he scored 17 goals for Jiul Petrosani, making him the top goalscorer of the team and the second goalscorer in Liga I, after Ovidiu Cornel Hanganu.

Honours
Universitatea Craiova
Cupa României: 1982–83

References

1961 births
Living people
Romanian footballers
Romanian expatriate footballers
Liga I players
Liga II players
CS Universitatea Craiova players
CSM Jiul Petroșani players
Hapoel Be'er Sheva F.C. players
Expatriate footballers in Israel
Romanian expatriate sportspeople in Israel
Association football forwards
Sportspeople from Craiova